Breanna Koenen (born 31 December 1994) is an Australian rules footballer and captain of the Brisbane Lions in the AFL Women's (AFLW).

Early life and state football
She was started playing for her home team, the Magnetic Island Magpies, together with her siblings. She later played for the North Cairns Tigers during the summers, and was selected for Queensland at State level several times, including captaining the under-18 team in 2012. In 2014, Koenen was awarded a Clem Jones Scholarship to study exercise science at the University of Queensland and to play for the University of Queensland Red Lions. In her first two seasons at University of Queensland, she won the best and fairest award twice consecutively. The following season, in 2016, she was named in the QWAFL Team of the Year. In 2017, she was selected for a second time for the QWAFL Team of the Year and was awarded a UQ Blue award by the University of Queensland for enhancing the reputation of university sport. Following Koenen's rise to the highest level of playing, the Youth Girls' best on ground award at the SeaLink AFL Carnival was named the Breanna L. Koenen Medal after her.

AFLW career
Koenen was recruited by Brisbane with the number 50 pick in the 2016 AFL Women's draft. She made her debut in Brisbane's inaugural game against Melbourne at Casey Fields on 5 February 2017. Brisbane signed Koenen for the 2018 season during the trade period in May 2017. In April 2019, Koenen re-signed with Brisbane for the 2020 season, and was then selected for the club's leadership group. During this season, she shifted forward from a back line defending role to the half-back line and the midfield.

Statistics
Statistics are correct to the end of the 2021 season.

|- style="background:#EAEAEA"
| scope="row" text-align:center | 2017
| 
| 3 || 8 || 0 || 0 || 34 || 17 || 51 || 13 || 19 || 0.0 || 0.0 || 4.3 || 2.1 || 6.4 || 1.6 || 2.4 || 0
|-
| scope="row" text-align:center | 2018
| 
| 3 || 8 || 1 || 0 || 57 || 32 || 89 || 26 || 14 || 0.0 || 0.0 || 7.1 || 4.0 || 11.1 || 3.3 || 1.8 || 0
|- style="background:#EAEAEA"
| scope="row" text-align:center | 2019
| 
| 3 || 5 || 1 || 0 || 38 || 15 || 53 || 12 || 14 || 0.2 || 0.0 || 7.6 || 3.0 || 10.6 || 2.4 || 2.8 || 0
|- 
| scope=row | 2020 ||  || 3
| 7 || 0 || 0 || 60 || 13 || 73 || 22 || 33 || 0.0 || 0.0 || 8.6 || 1.9 || 10.4 || 3.1 || 4.7 || 0
|- style=background:#EAEAEA
| scope=row bgcolor=F0E68C | 2021# ||  || 3
| 11 || 0 || 0 || 100 || 29 || 129 || 30 || 21 || 0.0 || 0.0 || 9.1 || 2.6 || 11.7 || 2.7 || 1.9 || 0
|- class="sortbottom"
! colspan=3 | Career
! 39
! 1
! 0
! 289
! 106
! 395
! 103
! 101
! 0.1
! 0.0
! 7.4
! 2.7
! 10.1
! 2.6
! 2.6
! 0
|}

Personal life
Koenen was born on the last day of 1994 in Magnetic Island. Her siblings are all sportive too, with her brother, Dirk, playing football with the Gold Coast Academy, her sister, Cara, playing netball with the Sunshine Coast Lightning in the National Netball League, and her younger sister Alyssa was an Australian representative in surfing. She studied exercise science at the University of Queensland. Apart from playing football, she works as a physiotherapist.

References

External links

1994 births
Living people
Sportswomen from Queensland
Australian rules footballers from Queensland
Brisbane Lions (AFLW) players